Thomas Hussey (by 1509 – will proved 1558), of Halton Holegate and Caythorpe, Lincolnshire, was an English politician.

He was a Member (MP) of the Parliament of England for Great Grimsby in 1545; Grantham in March 1553 and April 1554; and Lincolnshire in October 1553.

References

1558 deaths
Members of the Parliament of England for Great Grimsby
People from East Lindsey District
English MPs 1545–1547
Year of birth uncertain
English MPs 1553 (Edward VI)
English MPs 1553 (Mary I)
English MPs 1554
People from Caythorpe, Lincolnshire